Çınarcık Dam is a rock-fill dam on the Orhaneli River about  east of Mustafakemalpaşa in Bursa Province, Turkey. It serves several purposes to include power, irrigation, flood control and municipal water supply to the city of Bursa. The dam was constructed between 1996 and 2002. Construction of the Uluabat Hydroelectric Station, which the dam supplies water to, began in 2006 and it was commissioned in 2010. Water discharged from the 100 MW power station then enters the lake. The dam and power station are owned by the Turkish State Hydraulic Works.

See also

List of dams and reservoirs in Turkey

References
DSI directory, State Hydraulic Works (Turkey), Retrieved December 16, 2009

Dams in Bursa Province
Hydroelectric power stations in Turkey
Rock-filled dams
Dams completed in 2006
Energy infrastructure completed in 2010
2006 establishments in Turkey
21st-century architecture in Turkey